Livelock is a top-down shooter video game featuring both solo and cooperative multiplayer, developed by Montreal-based Tuque Games and published by Perfect World Entertainment on August 30, 2016.

The top-down twin stick shooter game has been described as similar to the Diablo series in gameplay, but with guns and in a post-apocalyptic setting.

Development and release
The game was first announced in January 2016. It is the first game by Perfect World Entertainment that is not a free-to-play title. The game became part of the Xbox Games With Gold program in September 2018.

Reception
The game received "mixed or average reviews" from 14 PC and PlayStation 4 (PS4) industry critics, and "generally favorable reviews" from 7 Xbox One industry critics, and holding aggregated Metacritic scores of 73/100 69/100 and 77/100, for its PC, PS4, and Xbox One versions respectively.

References

External links

Developer Tuque Games' website

2016 video games
Perfect World games
PlayStation 4 games
Multiplayer and single-player video games
Post-apocalyptic video games
Twin-stick shooters
Top-down video games
Video games developed in Canada
Windows games
Xbox One games